Plague Angel is the ninth studio album by Swedish black metal band Marduk. It was recorded and mixed at Endarker Studio in September 2004 and released that November by Regain Records. Plague Angel is the first Marduk album to feature Mortuus on vocals and Magnus "Devo" Andersson, ex-guitarist for Marduk following his departure in 1994, on bass and mixing. This album marked a definitive shift in Marduk's lyrical approach. Instead of overt Satanism, much of the lyrics take a more religious-like direction.  This is due to Morgan and Mortuus' fascination with the Bible, as they both admit to being Bible experts (despite Marduk's anti-religious stance, Morgan has admitted that he uses the Bible as inspiration solely for its violent content, as he finds death and violence to be most inspirational for Marduk, and that he can "write a complete song mentally by just looking at a violent painting or image"). "The Hangman of Prague" refers to Reinhard Heydrich after the invasion of Czechoslovakia.

Track listing

Credits

Marduk
Marduk - songwriting
  Mortuus – vocals
 Evil (Patrik Niclas Morgan Håkansson) – guitar
 Devo (Dan Everth Magnus Andersson) – bass; mixing
 Emil Dragutinovic – drums

Personnel on Deathmarch
Arditi - co-songwriting, performers

Layout
Ketoladog

References

2004 albums
Marduk (band) albums
Regain Records albums